Alatasi Tupou (born April 21, 1988) is a Samoan professional rugby union player from Apia, Samoa.  He has represented Samoa in both rugby fifteens and sevens and was also a member of Mystic River's the 2016 National Championship squad in the American Rugby Premiership.

Rugby career

Fifteens
Tupou first represented Samoa with the  Samoan U20 team in 2008.  He was quickly called up to the senior national fifteen a side team that same year, making his debut as the starting full-back against the New Zealand All Blacks on September 3, 2008, becoming the first junior player to graduate from playing in the IRB Junior World Championship to win full Test honors.  The following year he was named as a replacement scrum half for Samoa's Rugby World Cup Qualifier match against Papua New Guinea.

Sevens
Tupou has been a regular on the Samoan Sevens roster since he was eighteen years old and has been active in the World Rugby Sevens Series, scoring 467 points in nearly 200 matches throughout his 48 tournament appearances between 2006 and 2015.  In 2012, Tupou made headlines during the 2012 Wellington Sevens after he was tackled by an inebriated spectator who rushed onto the field during Samoa's final match of pool play against New Zealand.

In November 2016, Tupou was named to the Manu Samoan team to compete in the Dubai and South African legs of the 2016–17 World Rugby Sevens Series. The following year he was named to captain for Samoa's 2017/2018 rugby sevens season which began in July at the 2017 Dubai Sevens, leading his team to a 6th-place finish.  He continued with the Samoan squad for 7 more tournaments before serving a brief suspension due to a drunk driving incident prior to the London leg of the tour. After pleading guilty to driving under the influence and without a licence, Tupou was given a two-week suspension (not including his stand down from the London and Paris legs). Upon completion of his suspension Tupou would be named to the Samoan squad which competed in the 2018 Rugby World Cup Sevens in San Francisco, marking his first appearance since April.

Club career
In 2014, Tupou played for the Shirley Rugby Club in Christchurch, New Zealand.  He later signed with the Mystic River Rugby Club in Boston, Massachusetts in  2015, helping them win a bronze medal in the USA Rugby Club 7s Championship Series.  Tupou stayed with the Mystics for their 2015-2016 fifteen a side campaign in the American Rugby Premiership, helping them to a national title. Tupou scored 17 points (1 try, 2 penalties, 3 conversions) in the final match of the USA Rugby Emirates Airline Club Men's Division I National Championship, earning  Most Valuable Player honors.

References

External links 
 
 

1988 births
Living people
Rugby union scrum-halves
Samoan rugby union players
Samoa international rugby union players
Samoan expatriates in New Zealand
Samoa international rugby sevens players
Mystic River Rugby players
Sportspeople from Apia